Kathleen Freeman (22 June 1897 – 21 February 1959) was a British classical scholar and author of detective novels. Her detective fiction was published under the pseudonym Mary Fitt. Freeman was a lecturer in Greek at the University College of South Wales and Monmouthshire, Cardiff, between 1919 and 1946.

Early life and education

Kathleen Freeman was born in Yardley, Birmingham, and was the daughter of a commercial traveller, Charles H. Freeman, and Catharine Freeman, née Mawdesley. By the 1911 census, the family had moved to an eight-room house at 86 Conway Road, Cardiff.:315  Freeman's mother died in 1919, and her father died in 1932.:315 Freeman attended Canton High School on Market Road in Cardiff, which opened in 1907. Boys and girls were both educated in the school but separately in different subjects: Canton High School offered Latin but not to girls, and Freeman's schooling did not include Greek or Latin.

In a field dominated by men, she was an unlikely candidate to become a classicist of note.:315 No details have been found about when or with whom she started to learn ancient Greek.:316 Freeman knew Latin, French, German, Italian, and ancient and modern Greek. Except for French, which was taught at Canton High School, it remains unclear how she learnt these languages.:316

Freeman won a scholarship to study at the University College of South Wales and Monmouthshire, Cardiff, which began to accept male and female students in 1893.:317  She began her degree in 1915 and studied with Professor Gilbert Norwood.

Academic career 
Following her graduation in 1918 when she was awarded a BA, Freeman remained at University College and was appointed Lecturer in Greek in 1919. She went on to earn an MA in 1922 and a DLitt in 1940. A 1922 picture of the faculty at University College shows 41 men and 10 women. Only one of these women, Ida Beata Saxby, had a doctorate (University of London, 1918).:318

Freeman is best known for her works The Pre-Socratic Philosophers: A Companion to Diels, Fragmente Der Vorsokratiker (1946), and Ancilla to the Pre-Socratic Philosophers (1947/48), a translation of and handbook to the fragments of Pre-Socratic philosophers collected by Diels.  

From early in her career, Freeman worked to bring Greek texts to the general public through her work in translating texts and presenting her ideas to general audiences.:333 Freeman featured on BBC radio in 1926 presenting a series on 'Writers of Greece', including Greek authors such as Aristophanes, Thucydides and Empedocles.

During the Second World War Freeman delivered lectures on Greece for the Ministry of Information and in the National Scheme of Education for HM Forces in South Wales and Monmouthshire.:323 She further contributed to the war effort with her selections of translations from Greek authors which featured in The Western Mail, a Cardiff-based newspaper. These were later published as the book, It Has All Happened Before: What the Greeks Thought of their Nazis (1941). Her publications Voices of Freedom (1943), What They Said at the Time: A Survey of the Causes of the Second World War (1945) and her work with the Philosophical Society of England, where she acted as Supervisor of Studies from 1948 to 1952 before becoming the Chairman in 1952, are further testimony to her desire to make Greek ideas accessible through translation. Freeman resigned from the university in 1946 in order to pursue her research and writing.

Fiction-writing career 
Freeman enjoyed success as a writer of fiction and wrote under the pseudonyms Mary Fitt (1936–60), Stuart Mary Wick (1948; 1950), Clare St. Donat (1950) and Caroline Cory (1956). 

In 1926, in addition to her study The Work and Life of Solon, Freeman published a collection of short stories The Intruder and Other Stories, and her first novel Martin Hanner. A Comedy. In 1936 she began publishing crime fiction under the pseudonym Mary Fitt, writing 27 books and a number of short stories. In 1950 she became a member of the Detection Club. Her books were critically acclaimed at the time, although since her death many have been out of print. She also wrote twelve children's stories and T'other Miss Austen (1956), a study of Jane Austen.

In recent years Freeman's work has been re-assessed, especially in the light of Welsh women and modernism. [Acknowledgements]  Her short stories have also been described as antecedents of the Kate North's queer stories, and, as of 2019, republication of some of her short stories was planned.  [p. 442]

Personal life 

From some time in the 1930s until her death, she lived with her girlfriend, Dr. Liliane Marie Catherine Clopet (1901–1987), a GP and author, at Lark's Rise, a house on Druidstone Road in St Mellons, now a district of Cardiff. 

Freeman dedicated all her novels (written as Freeman, rather than Fitt) to Clopet from This Love (1929) onwards. The presentation copy of The Work and Life of Solon has survived, which Freeman dedicated to Clopet, dated to 14 July 1926. Freeman's inscription includes a slight misspelling of Clopet's name, which has been thought by antiquarian bookseller Peter Harrington, to indicate that Freeman and Clopet were in the early stages of their relationship. Freeman died in 1959 in St. Mellons at the age of 61. Clopet considerably outlived Freeman, dying in 1987 in Newport.

Bibliography

Academic publications

1926: The Work and Life of Solon, with a translation of his poems, Cardiff: University of Wales Press Board. 
1941: It Has All Happened Before: What the Greeks Thought of their Nazis, London: F. Muller Ltd. OCLC 5290960
1943: Voices of Freedom, London: F. Muller Ltd. OCLC 912104035
1945: What They Said at the Time: A Survey of the Causes of the Second World War, London: F. Muller Ltd. OCLC 921002880
1946: The Pre-Socratic Philosophers; a companion to Diels, Fragmente der Vorsokratiker, Oxford: Blackwell. 
1946: The Murder of Herodes and Other Trials from the Athenian law courts, London, MacDonald. 
1947: The Greek way: an Anthology. Translations from verse and prose, London, MacDonald. 
1947/48: Ancilla to the pre-Socratic philosophers: a complete translation of the fragments in Diels, Fragmente der Vorsokratiker, Oxford and Cambridge, Mass., Blackwell and Harvard University Press. 
1948: The Philoctetes of Sophocles, a modern version, London: Muller. 
1950: Greek city-states, London, Macdonald; New York: W. W. Norton. 
1952: God, Man and State. Greek concepts, London: Macdonald. 
1954: The Paths of Justice, London: Lutterworth Press. 
1954: Everyday things in Ancient Greece, London, Batsford. A one-volume revision of Everyday Things in Homeric Greece, Everyday Things in Archaic Greece, and Everyday Things in Classical Greece by C. H. Quennell and Marjorie Quennell. 1929–32. 
1954: The Sophists. Translation of Mario Untersteiner, I sofisti, Oxford: Blackwell.

Selected fictional publications 

 1926: The Intruder and Other Stories, London: Jonathan Cape. OCLC 560414633 
 1926: Martin Hanner. A Comedy, New York: Harcourt, Brace and Co. OCLC 560414667
 1936: Three Sisters Flew Home, London: Nicholson & Watson. 
 1937: The Three Hunting Horns, London: Nicholson & Watson. 
 1938: Expected Death, London: Nicholson & Watson. 
 1941: Death on Herons' Mere, London: Michael Joseph. 
 1941: Aftermath of Murder, New York: Doubleday. 
 1946: Death and the Pleasant Voices, London: Michael Joseph. 
 1948: And Where's Mr Bellamy?, London: Hutchinson. 
 1941: Death and Mary Dazill, London: Michael Joseph. 
 1950: Pity for Pamela, London: Macdonald & Co. 
 1952: Clues to Christabel, London: Pan Books. 
 1959: Mizmaze, London: Michael Joseph.

Further reading
Biography and bibliography by M. Eleanor Irwin
How to Conceal a Female Scholar; or, the Invisible Classicist of Cardiff by Edith Hall
Deininger, Michelle, and Claire Flay-Petty, "University Connections and Professional Lives: S. Beryl Jones, Kathleen Freeman and Liliane Clopet", New Welsh Reader, 119 (December 2018). Snippet available at https://www.newwelshreview.com/article.php?id=2307 
Deininger, Michelle and Claire Flay-Petty, "The Cash-Box and The Specimen Tin", Planet: The Welsh Internationalist, 226 (Summer 2017). 
 Greene, W. C. (1949), "Review: Pre-Socratic Philosophers Ancilla to the Pre-Socratic Philosophers: A Complete Translation of the Fragments in Diels by Kathleen Freeman", The Classical Journal, Vol. 45, No. 1 (October 1949), pp. 53–4 
Irwin, M. E. (2004), "Freeman, Kathleen (1897–1959)", in Todd, R. B (ed.), The Dictionary of British Classicists. Volume I, A-F, Bristol: Thoemmes Continuum, pp. 343–4
Irwin, Eleanor (2016), "An Unconventional Classicist: the Work and Life of Kathleen Freeman" in Rosie Wyles and Edith Hall (eds), Women classical scholars : unsealing the fountain from the Renaissance to Jacqueline de Romilly (Oxford University Press)

References

External links
 Ancilla to the Pre-Socratic Philosophers – Kathleen Freeman's complete translation of the fragments in Diels (Fifth Edition, B-fragments):  Google Books, HTML
 Inspirational People: 3. Kathleen Freeman – Classicist and Fiction Writer
 Entry for the Dictionary of Welsh Biography

1897 births
1959 deaths
20th-century British novelists
20th-century English women writers
20th-century pseudonymous writers
Academics of Cardiff University
Alumni of Cardiff University
English classical scholars
English mystery writers
Members of the Detection Club
People from Yardley
Pseudonymous women writers
Women classical scholars
Women mystery writers
Writers from Birmingham, West Midlands